Tippin'  is an album by saxophonist Jim Snidero which was recorded in 2007 and released on the Savant label.

Reception

In his review on Allmusic, Scott Yanow states "After nearly a quarter-century of other musical experiences, he sat in with his friend, organist Mike LeDonne, in 2006 and enjoyed returning to the basic blues, ballads and standards. Their 2007 recording features Snidero playing more boppish and a bit more basic than one might expect, perfectly fitting into the idiom. He caresses the melodies of ballads and brings out the bluish side of the faster tunes".<ref name="Allmusic">{{allMusic|class=album|id=mw0000781455|first= Scott|last=Yanow|label= Jim Snidero: Tippin''': Review|accessdate=February 22, 2019}}</ref> In JazzTimes, Mike Shanley wrote "Alto saxophonist Jim Snidero’s beefy tone and fleet attack evokes Cannonball Adderley in many places on Tippin' . At the same time, Snidero takes these comparisons and places them in a context that contrasts with Adderley’s setting of choice: the organ trio" On All About Jazz, John Barron called it " a spirited session of burners, ballads and blues" stating "There's nothing startling about Tippin' ''. It's just hip, swinging music performed exceptionally well. Snidero and crew leave a soulful impression".

Track listing 
All compositions by Jim Snidero except where noted
 "Tippin'" – 5:15
 "Let's Be Frank (Dedicated to Frank Wess)" – 5:41
 "Young Like" (Mike LeDonne) – 6:39
 "The More I See You" (Harry Warren, Mack Gordon) – 5:46
 "Lover Man (Oh, Where Can You Be?)" (Jimmy Davis, Ram Ramirez, James Sherman) – 5:28
 "You Stepped out of a Dream" (Nacio Herb Brown, Gus Kahn) – 4:28
 "K2" – 6:32
 "Alone Together" (Arthur Schwartz, Howard Dietz) – 7:00
 "Fried Oysters" – 5:08

Personnel 
Jim Snidero – alto saxophone
Mike LeDonne – Hammond B3
Paul Bollenback – guitar
Tony Reedus – drums

References 

Jim Snidero albums
2007 albums
Savant Records albums
Albums recorded at Van Gelder Studio